The 2004–05 Tetley's Bitter Rugby Union County Championship was the 105th edition of England's County Championship rugby union club competition. 

Devon won their ninth title after defeating Lancashire in the final.

Final

See also
 English rugby union system
 Rugby union in England

References

Rugby Union County Championship
County Championship (rugby union) seasons